Nelly Glauser (born 27 January 1966) is a Swiss long-distance runner. She competed in the women's marathon at the 1996 Summer Olympics.

References

1966 births
Living people
Athletes (track and field) at the 1996 Summer Olympics
Swiss female long-distance runners
Swiss female marathon runners
Olympic athletes of Switzerland
Place of birth missing (living people)